Beedles Station was the first settlement in what was to become Warren County, Ohio, United States.  A blockhouse was established there in 1795 in what is now Section 28, Town 4, Range 3 of the Between the Miami Rivers Survey in western Turtlecreek Township. This is on the west side of State Route 741 about a mile south of Otterbein. The settlement was named for William Beedle, an early settler. A historical plaque marks the site.

References

Geography of Warren County, Ohio
Ghost towns in Ohio
Populated places established in 1795